Story Paper Collectors' Digest was a journal published from November 1946 until May 2005, and with special intermittent issues continuing on until late 2007. It was created by Herbert Leckenby. With articles on story papers, it heavily featured the work of Charles Hamilton, Edwy Searles Brooks and the tales of detectives Sexton Blake and Nelson Lee. It was published monthly until 2004. The editors were Herbert Leckenby until his death in October 1959, then Eric Fayne until January 1987 when he retired as editor, then Mary Cadogan.

Contributors included Roger Jenkins, Gerald Allison, Breeze Bentley, Jim Cook, Jack Wood, Laurie Sutton, Josie and Len Packman, Bob Whiter, Jack Overhill, W. O. G. Lofts, and the respective editors.

A Collectors' Digest Annual appeared, under the same editors, from 1947 onwards. It contained more substantial material.

See also
 British comics
 Just William
 Penny dreadful
 Sexton Blake
 Story paper 
 The Boys' Friend
 The Gem
 The Sexton Blake Library
 The Nelson Lee Library
 The Magnet

External links
 PDFS of The Collectors Digest at Friardale.co.uk 
 Blakiana: The Ultimate Sexton Blake Resource

British children's literature
Monthly magazines published in the United Kingdom
Defunct literary magazines published in the United Kingdom
Magazines established in 1946
Magazines disestablished in 2007